Normac is a floating restaurant boat that was launched as a fire tug, named the James R. Elliot. She was built at the Jenks Shipbuilding Company in Port Huron, Michigan, in 1902.

History
After she lost her usefulness as a fire tug, she was sold in 1930 to the Owen Sound Transportation Company Limited. At that time, she was taken to the Georgian Bay Shipbuilding Company at Midland for conversion into a combination package freighter and passenger ferry, and from a steamer to a diesel powered vessel.

In 1931, the vessel was renamed the Normac which was the namesake of captain "Norman Mckay," founder and general manager of Owen Sound Transportation Company Limited, which is still running today. Mckay was the captain of the company flagship SS Manitoulin.

The Normac sailed the Owen Sound to Sault Ste. Marie route via Killarney and the North Channel, commencing July 16, 1931. From 1932, she sailed the Manitoulin Island - Tobermory route and in later years, along this same route with the S.S. Norisle. After the M.S Norgoma was converted to diesel fuel and placed on the Tobermory run, in 1964 the Normac took up the role as an automobile ferry across the North Channel from Meldrum Bay to Blind River and Cockburn Island, a portion of its original run from Owen Sound. Normac remained on this route until the close of the 1968 season when she was retired. She was sold to Donald F. Lee of Port Lambton Ontario, and moved from Owen Sound to Wallaceburg Ontario, where she spent the winter.

She was then sold in 1969, to John Letnik, and was converted into Captain John's Harbour Boat Restaurant, a floating restaurant in Toronto Harbour. The Normac arrived at Toronto in her Owen Sound colours, and was soon painted all white. Shortly afterward the steel hull was repainted bright red, to make it more noticeable from the street. Permanently moored at the foot of Yonge Street, she was severely damaged in 1981 when the Toronto Island ferry Trillium struck her, causing a slow leak and her sinking two weeks later.

The Normac was raised in 1986 and refurbished to serve as a floating restaurant in other communities. With her amidships state rooms removed, she served as Tokyo Joe's Marina Bar and Grill, a floating restaurant and cocktail lounge at Port Dalhousie, Ontario until she was gutted by fire in 2011. She was restored and became the Riverboat Mexican Grill. The now vacant ship remains docked at Port Dalhousie Pier Marina.

References

Ferries of the Owen Sound Transportation Company
Transport in Manitoulin District
1902 ships
Fireboats of Detroit
Buildings and structures in St. Catharines
Floating restaurants
Ships built in Port Huron, Michigan